Michael Kenneth Mann (born February 5, 1943) is an American director, screenwriter, and producer, best known for his distinctive style of crime drama. His most acclaimed works include the films Thief (1981), Manhunter (1986), The Last of the Mohicans (1992), Heat (1995), The Insider (1999), Collateral (2004), and Public Enemies (2009). He is also known for his role as executive producer on the popular TV series Miami Vice (1984–89), which he adapted into a 2006 feature film.

For his work, he has received nominations from international organizations and juries, including the British Academy of Film and Television Arts, Cannes, and the Academy of Motion Picture Arts and Sciences. As a producer, Mann has twice received nominations for the Academy Award for Best Picture, first for The Insider and then The Aviator (2004), which Mann had been hired to direct before the project was transferred to Martin Scorsese. Total Film ranked Mann No. 28 on its 2007 list of the 100 Greatest Directors Ever, and Sight and Sound ranked him No. 5 on their list of the 10 Best Directors of the Last 25 Years (for the years 1977–2002).

Early life and education
Mann was born February 5, 1943, in Chicago, Illinois. He is the son of Jewish grocers Esther and Jack Mann.

Mann studied English literature at the University of Wisconsin–Madison. While a student, he saw Stanley Kubrick's Dr. Strangelove and fell in love with movies. In an L.A. Weekly interview, he described the film's impact on him:

Mann graduated from Wisconsin with a B.A. in 1965. In 1967 he earned an M.A. from the London Film School.

Career

Early work
Mann later moved to London in the mid 1960s to go to graduate school in cinema. He went on to receive a graduate degree at the London Film School in 1967. He spent seven years in the United Kingdom going to film school and then working on commercials along with contemporaries Alan Parker, Ridley Scott and Adrian Lyne. In 1968, footage he shot of the Paris student revolt for a documentary, Insurrection, aired on NBC's First Tuesday news program and he developed his '68 experiences into the short film Jaunpuri which won the Jury Prize at Cannes in 1970.

Mann returned to United States after divorcing his first wife in 1971. He went on to direct a road trip documentary, 17 Days Down the Line. Three years later, Hawaii Five-O veteran Robert Lewin gave Mann a shot and a crash course on television writing and story structure. Mann wrote four episodes of Starsky and Hutch (three in the first season and one in the second) and the pilot episode for Vega$. Around this time, he worked on a show called Police Story with cop-turned-novelist Joseph Wambaugh. Police Story concentrated on the detailed realism of a real cop's life and taught Mann that first-hand research was essential to bring authenticity to his work. Mann also wrote an early draft of the 1978 film Straight Time.

1980s 
His first feature movie was a television special called The Jericho Mile, which was released theatrically in Europe. It won the Emmy for Outstanding Writing in a Limited Series or a Special in 1979 and the DGA Best Director award.
His television work also includes being the executive producer on Miami Vice and Crime Story. Contrary to popular belief, he was not the creator of these shows, but the executive producer and showrunner, produced by his production company.

Mann's debut feature in cinema as director was Thief (1981) starring James Caan, a relatively accurate depiction of thieves that operated in New York City and Chicago at that time. Mann used actual former professional burglars to keep the technical scenes as genuine as possible. His next film was The Keep (1983), a supernatural thriller set in Nazi-occupied Romania. Though it was a commercial flop, the film has since attained cult status amongst fans.

In 1986, Mann was the first to bring Thomas Harris' character of serial killer Hannibal Lecter to the screen with Manhunter, his adaptation of the novel Red Dragon, which starred Brian Cox as Hannibal. In an interview on the Manhunter DVD, star William Petersen comments that because Mann is so focused on his creations, it takes several years for him to complete a film; Petersen believes that this is why Mann does not make films very often.

1990s
Mann gained widespread recognition in 1992 for his film adaptation of James Fenimore Cooper's novel into the epic historical drama The Last of the Mohicans starring Daniel Day-Lewis. The film is set during the French and Indian War. Film critic Owen Gleiberman of Entertainment Weekly described Mann's directorial style writing, "Mann, at his best, is a master of violence and lyrical anxiety". Peter Travers of Rolling Stone praised Mann's directing writing, "the action is richly detailed and thrillingly staged."

This was followed by crime drama Heat (1995) starring Al Pacino, Robert De Niro, and Val Kilmer. The film, a remake of his TV movie L.A. Takedown, was a critical success with Kenneth Turan of the Los Angeles Times calling the film a "sleek, accomplished piece of work, meticulously controlled and completely involving. The dark end of the street doesn't get much more inviting than this." Todd McCarthy of Variety wrote, "Stunningly made and incisively acted by a large and terrific cast, Michael Mann's ambitious study of the relativity of good and evil stands apart from other films of its type by virtue of its extraordinarily rich characterizations and its thoughtful, deeply melancholy take on modern life."

In 1999, Mann filmed The Insider about the 60 Minutes segment about Jeffrey Wigand, a whistleblower in the tobacco industry. Russell Crowe portrayed Wigand, with Al Pacino playing Lowell Bergman, and Christopher Plummer as Mike Wallace. The film showcased Mann's cinematic style and garnered the most critical recognition of his career up to this point. The Insider was nominated for seven Academy Awards as a result, including a nomination for Mann's direction. Critic Roger Ebert of the Chicago Sun-Times praised the film writing, "The Insider had a greater impact on me than All the President's Men, because you know what? Watergate didn't kill my parents. Cigarettes did."

2000s
With his next film, Ali (2001), starring Will Smith, Mann started experimenting with digital cameras. For his action thriller film Collateral, which cast Tom Cruise against type by giving him the role of a hitman, Mann shot all of the exterior scenes digitally so that he could achieve more depth and detail during the night scenes while shooting most of the interiors on film stock. Jamie Foxx was nominated for an Academy Award for his performance in Collateral. In 2004, Mann produced The Aviator, based on the life of Howard Hughes, which he had developed with Leonardo DiCaprio. The Aviator was nominated for an Academy Award for Best Picture but lost to Million Dollar Baby. After Collateral, Mann directed the film adaptation of Miami Vice which he also executive produced. It stars a completely new cast with Colin Farrell as Don Johnson's character Sonny Crockett, and Jamie Foxx filling Philip Michael Thomas' shoes.

Mann was producer with Peter Berg as director for The Kingdom and Hancock. Hancock stars Will Smith as a hard-drinking superhero who has fallen out of favor with the public and who begins to have a relationship with the wife (Charlize Theron) of a public relations expert (Jason Bateman), who is helping him to repair his image. Mann also makes a cameo appearance in the film as an executive.

In 2009, Mann wrote and directed Public Enemies for Universal Pictures, about the Depression-era crime wave, based on Bryan Burrough's nonfiction book, Public Enemies: America's Greatest Crime Wave and the Birth of the FBI, 1933–34. It starred Johnny Depp and Christian Bale. Depp played John Dillinger in the film, and Bale played Melvin Purvis, the FBI agent in charge of capturing Dillinger.

Mann signed a petition in support of film director Roman Polanski in 2009, calling for his release after Polanski was arrested in Switzerland in relation to his 1977 charge for drugging and raping a 13-year-old girl.

2010s
In January 2010, it was reported by Variety that Mann, alongside David Milch, would serve as co-executive producer of new TV series Luck. The series was an hour-long HBO production, and Mann directed the series' pilot. Although initially renewed for a second season after the airing of the pilot, it was eventually cancelled due to the death of three horses during production.

On February 14, 2013, it was announced that Mann had been developing an untitled thriller film with screenwriter Morgan Davis Foehl for over a year, for Legendary Pictures. In May 2013, Mann started filming the action thriller, named Blackhat, in Los Angeles, Kuala Lumpur, Hong Kong and Jakarta. The film, starring Chris Hemsworth as a hacker who gets released from prison to pursue a cyberterrorist across the globe, was released on January 16, 2015 by Universal. It received mixed reviews and was a commercial disaster, although several critics included it in their year-end "best-of" lists.

2020s
Mann directed the first episode of the 2022 crime series Tokyo Vice for HBO Max.

In August 2022, Mann released Heat 2, a novel he had co-written with Meg Gardiner. The book takes place from 1988 to 2000, covering events that happen before and after the 1995 film.

The same month, Mann began shooting his upcoming film Ferrari starring Adam Driver and Penélope Cruz in Modena.

Filming style and themes
His trademarks include powerfully-lit nighttime scenes and unusual scores, such as Tangerine Dream in Thief and the new-age score to Manhunter. A common stylistic device in several films (Last of the Mohicans, Heat, Manhunter, The Insider, Miami Vice) is to show principal characters being forced to make critical decisions affecting the plot while overlooking large bodies of water.

Dante Spinotti is a frequent cinematographer of Mann's films.

F.X. Feeney describes Mann's body of work in DGA Quarterly as "abundantly energetic in its precision and variety" and "psychologically layered".

Indiewire's 2014 retrospective of the director's filmography focused on the intensity of Mann's ongoing interest in "stories pitting criminals against those who seek to put them behind bars (Heat, Public Enemies, Thief, Collateral, Miami Vice). His films frequently suggest that in fact, at the top of their respective games, crooks and cops are not so dissimilar as men: they each live and die by their own codes and they each recognize themselves in the other."

Mann's films have been noted for their realism when it comes to capturing the sounds of gunfire, with him preferring to use raw audio captured from the scene, rather than a sound mix. Many of his films feature practical effects to produce the action scenes, with actors attending boot camps for weapons handling and firing 'full load' blanks in scenes to accurately represent the sound of live ammunition.

Advertising
Mann directed the 2002 "Lucky Star" advertisement for Mercedes-Benz, which took the form of a film trailer for a purported thriller featuring Benicio del Toro. In the fall of 2007, Mann directed two commercials for Nike. The ad campaign "Leave Nothing" features football action scenes with former NFL players Shawne Merriman and Steven Jackson, as well as using the score "Promontory" from the soundtrack of The Last of the Mohicans. Mann also directed the 2008 promotional video for Ferrari's California sports car.

Favorite films 
In 2012, Mann participated in the Sight & Sound film polls of that year. Held every ten years to select the greatest films of all time, contemporary directors were asked to select ten films of their choice. Mann gave the following ten in alphabetical order.

 Apocalypse Now (1979) directed by Francis Ford Coppola
 Avatar (2009) directed by James Cameron
 Battleship Potemkin (1925) directed by Sergei Eisenstein
 Biutiful (2010) directed by Alejandro González Iñárritu
 Citizen Kane (1941) directed by Orson Welles
 Dr. Strangelove (1964) directed by Stanley Kubrick
 My Darling Clementine (1946) directed by John Ford
 The Passion of Joan of Arc (1928) directed by Carl Theodor Dreyer
 Raging Bull (1980) directed by Martin Scorsese
 The Wild Bunch (1969) directed by Sam Peckinpah

Personal life 

Mann's daughter Ami Canaan Mann is also a film director and producer.

Filmography

Awards and nominations

Bibliography
Wildermuth, Mark E. (2005). Blood in the Moonlight: Michael Mann and Information Age Cinema (Paperback Ed.). Jefferson, North Carolina: McFarland Company and Inc. .
F. X. Feeney, Paul Duncan (2006). Michael Mann (Hardcover Ed.) Taschen. .
Cadieux, Axel (2015). L'Horizon de Michael Mann, Playlist Society.
Jean-Baptiste Thoret, Michael Mann. Mirages du contemporain, Flammarion, 2021.

References

External links

 
 Michael Mann on Instagram
 Senses of Cinema: Great Directors Critical Database
 Literature on Michael Mann

Interviews
 Entertainment Weekly: Part I Part II
 L.A. Weekly
 DGA magazine
 Salon
 "Paint It Black" – Sight and Sound

1943 births
Alumni of the London Film School
Film producers from Illinois
Jewish American screenwriters
American male screenwriters
Television producers from Illinois
American television writers
American people of Russian-Jewish descent
American expatriates in England
Filmmakers who won the Best Film BAFTA Award
Golden Globe Award-winning producers
Film directors from Illinois
Living people
American male television writers
Primetime Emmy Award winners
University of Wisconsin–Madison College of Letters and Science alumni
Writers from Chicago
Action film directors
Screenwriters from Illinois
21st-century American Jews